Zappatore is an Italian drama film directed by Alfonso Brescia and  starring Mario Merola. The film was released in Italy on 5 December 1980.

It is the "cine-scripted" which received the highest grossing theaters, ranking the 60th place of the most successful films in Italy in the 1980/81 season.

The film is loosely based on the eponymous song, written by Libero Bovio and Albano.

Story 
Francesco Esposito and his wife Madeleine are two farmers who raised Mario, their only child, with love and dedication. To finance his education, they became indebted to a lender. Mario becomes a brilliant lawyer in Naples, the city in which he works, and falls in love with Nancy, the daughter of an Italian-American industrialist. Despite the potential for a happy ending, the story is one of guilt and shame that Mario must reconcile his newfound social position contrasted with the humble beginnings of his parents.

Cast
Mario Merola: Francesco, the digger
Regina Bianchi: Maddalena
Gerardo Amato: Mario son of Franscesco and Maddalena, lawyer
Biagio Pelligra: accountant Vizzini
Aldo Giuffré: Superintendent of Police
Mara Venier: Nancy
Alberto Farnese: Mike Barker, father of nancy 
Matilde Ciccia: Assuntina
Rick Battaglia: Don Andrea
Giacomo Rizzo: Pasqualino
Lucio Montanaro: Gennarino

External links

1980 films
Italian drama films
1980s Italian-language films
Films directed by Alfonso Brescia
1980s Italian films